Prōtostratōr was a Byzantine court office, originating as the imperial stable master. Its proximity to the imperial person led to a highly visible role in imperial ceremonies, and served as a springboard for several capable individuals, like Manuel the Armenian or the future emperors Michael II and Basil I the Macedonian, to reach the highest offices. From the mid-11th century, the post rose in importance, becoming more an honorific dignity for senior members of the court, than an actual office. From the 13th century on, the post could be held by several persons, and ranked eighth in the overall hierarchy of the court. Throughout its history, it was a title often borne by senior military commanders. The female form of the title, given to the wives of the prōtostratores, was prōtostratorissa (πρωτοστρατόρισσα).

History and evolution

A  appears under Justinian II and a prōtostratōr of the Opsikion named Rouphos in 712. The first holder of the post to be mentioned as a relatively important personage, however, is the  Constantine, son of the  Bardanes, mentioned near the bottom of a list of victims of iconoclast persecution under Constantine V in 765. The spatharios Constantine is also the first known holder of the post of "imperial prōtostratōr" (βασιλικός πρωτοστράτωρ).

During the middle Byzantine period (up to the late 11th century), the official place of the imperial  in the hierarchy was not high, but its proximity to the emperor did facilitate a rapid rise of its holders, as exemplified by the career of Manuel the Armenian or the future emperors Michael II and Basil I the Macedonian. In the Klētorologion of 899 he is recorded as one of the "special dignities" and ranked 48th among the sixty most senior palace officials. Holders of the post could aspire to some of the highest court ranks, such as anthypatos patrikios or prōtospatharios. The imperial prōtostratōr had a prominent place in public ceremonies, riding beside the emperor on processions (along with his superior, the Count of the Stable) or during the hunt. During campaigns, he and the Count of the Stable stood by near the imperial tent, along with three stratores with harnessed horses. In triumphal processions from the Great Palace to the Forum of Constantine he carried the emperor's banner (flammoulon), preceding the emperor from the hall of the consistorium until the forum, and placed the imperial spear on the neck of the captive Arab leaders. On certain occasions, he even had the task of introducing foreign envoys at imperial audiences.

By the mid-11th century, however, the post seems to have risen in importance, and was now awarded as an honorific court dignity to distinguished members of the court. During the Komnenian period (1081–1185), the post rose further in the court hierarchy, so that the historian Nikephoros Bryennios the Younger was able to remark that "this office has always been important to the emperors and was conferred on the highest personages", while the 12th-century historian Zonaras, influenced by current usage, writes, referring to the conferment of the post to Basil the Macedonian, that "this dignity was that of distinguished persons and relatives of the emperors". Holders during the Komnenian period included the distinguished military commanders Michael Doukas, brother-in-law of Alexios I Komnenos, and Alexios Axouch, who had married the niece of Manuel I Komnenos.

Writing around 1200, Niketas Choniates equated the office with the Western marshal, and it appears to have been used interchangeably with the latter title in the Latin Empire and the other Latin states formed after the Fourth Crusade. The office continued to exist during the Palaiologan period until the Fall of Constantinople in 1453. It remained one of the highest dignities of state, ranking eighth overall in the hierarchy, although from the late 13th century on, multiple persons could hold it.

Its insignia of office were similar to those of the megas doux, i.e. a rich silk kabbadion tunic, a golden-red  hat decorated with embroideries in the  style, without veil, or a domed  hat, again in red and gold and decorated with golden wire, with a portrait of the emperor standing in front, and another of him enthroned in the rear. Only his staff of office differed, with only the topmost carved knots in gold, and the rest in silver. The knobs in the staff remained gold, bordered with silver braid.

The title is also attested in the medieval Kingdom of Georgia, where it was held by the duke (eristavi) of Svaneti, Iovane Vardanisdze, under King David IV. A variant of the title, stratoros, was also used in the Kingdom of Cyprus in the 15th century.

List of known holders 
Note: the list does not include holders known only through their seals but otherwise unidentified.

References

Sources

 
 
 
 
 
 
 
 
 
 

Byzantine palace offices
Byzantine military offices
Greek words and phrases
Military history of the Kingdom of Georgia
Lists of office-holders in the Byzantine Empire
Protostratores